The Geißfuß is a mountain in Bavaria, Germany.

Mountains of Bavaria
Mountains of the Alps